Milot Rashica (born 28 June 1996) is an Albanian-Kosovan footballer. He is a professional footballer who plays as an attacking midfielder or winger for Süper Lig club Galatasaray, on loan from  club Norwich City, and the Kosovo national team.

Club career

Early career
Rashica was born in Vučitrn, FR Yugoslavia, in present-day Kosovo. He made his professional debut with local club Vushtrria, aged only 16. In August 2013, after a trial period at Gent, he refused a transfer offer from the club and made his senior debut with Vushtrria.

In September 2013, after suffering an injury, Rashica moved to Hannover for treatment and only returned to his parent club in 2014.

Vitesse

On 10 September 2014, Rashica moved to Vitesse on a trial basis, appearing for the club's youth team. On 10 February 2015, he signed a three-year deal with the Arnhem side, being effective on 1 July, for a reported €300,000 fee.

On 30 July 2015, Rashica made his professional debut, coming on as a second-half substitute for Uroš Đurđević in a 3–0 away loss against Southampton for the third qualifying round of 2015–16 UEFA Europa League. On 9 August, he made his Eredivisie debut, starting and assisting Denys Oliynyk in a 1–1 away draw against Willem II.

On 20 September 2015, Rashica scored his first professional goal, netting the last in a 3–0 home victory against De Graafschap. On 18 December, he scored a brace in a 5–1 routing of Twente also at the GelreDome.

He played as Vitesse won the final of the KNVB Beker 2–0 against AZ Alkmaar on 30 April 2017 to lead the club, three-time runners up, to the title for the first time in its 125-year history.

Werder Bremen
On 31 January 2018, Rashica joined Bundesliga side Werder Bremen, reportedly signing a 4.5-year contract until 2022. On 3 February 2018, he made his debut in a 2–1 away win against Schalke 04 after being named in the Werder Bremen starting eleven.

Rashica started in Werder Bremen's first match of the 2019–20 season against Fortuna Düsseldorf and assisted Johannes Eggestein's goal before sustaining an injury and being subbed off. He scored his first goal of the 2019–20 season on his return from an injury, on the sixth matchday of the season against Borussia Dortmund in a 2–2 draw against the black and yellows.

Norwich City
On 22 June 2021, Rashica signed a four-year contract with the newly promoted Premier League club Norwich City, and received squad number 17. Norwich City reportedly paid a €11 million transfer fee plus a possible €4 million in bonuses. On 14 August 2021, he made his debut in a 3–0 home defeat against Liverpool after being named in the starting line-up.

Rashica scored his first goal for Norwich City in January 2022, when he netted the winning goal in an FA Cup tie at Charlton Athletic. He provided an assist for Josh Sargent as Norwich City moved out of the Premier League relegation zone with a 3–0 win over Watford. He scored his first Premier League goal for Norwich when he scored the first goal in a 3–1 defeat away to Liverpool at Anfield; in doing so he became the first Kosovan to score in the Premier League.

Loan to Galatasaray
On 8 September 2022, Rashica joined Süper Lig side Galatasaray, on a season-long loan. Galatasaray will reportedly pay him a €1.5 million net fee. His debut with Galatasaray came three days later in a 3–2 away win against Kasımpaşa after coming on as a substitute at 83rd minute in place of Yunus Akgün. He scored his first goal against Giresunspor on 28 January 2023, after substituting in place of Dries Mertens. As of early March 2023, he scored 2 goals and made 3 goal assists in 18 official games he played for Galatasaray.

International career

Albania

Under-17
Rashica was called up to Albania's under-17 team by coach Džemal Mustedanagić for the 2013 UEFA European Under-17 Championship qualifying round in October 2012, and made his debut for the side on the 18th, starting in a 1–0 loss against Italy. Five days later, he scored the fifth in a 6–0 routing of Liechtenstein; he appeared in three matches and scored once, as Albania was knocked out after finishing third in its group.

Under-19
On 7 November 2014, Rashica was called up to the under-19s by coach Altin Lala ahead of 2015 UEFA European Under-19 Championship qualifying round. He appeared against Denmark, Portugal and Wales, as Albania was again eliminated.

Under-21
On 28 August 2015, Rashica was included in Redi Jupi's under-21 squad for the 2017 UEFA European Under-21 Championship qualification matches against Israel and Portugal. He made his debut on 3 September, playing the full 90 minutes in a 1–1 home draw against the former, and also suffering a penalty which was later converted by Endri Çekiçi.

Senior
Rashica made his debut for the full squad on 29 March 2016, coming on as a second-half substitute for Ledian Memushaj in a 2–0 friendly win against Luxembourg. He only appeared in one further match for the national setup, a 3–1 win against Qatar on 29 May.

Kosovo
On 15 August 2016, it was announced that Rashica had switched to Kosovo. On 30 August 2016, he received a call-up from Kosovo for a 2018 FIFA World Cup qualification match against Finland and made his debut after being named in the starting line-up.

Career statistics

Club

International

Scores and results list Kosovo's goal tally first, score column indicates score after each Rashica goal.

Honours
Vushtrria
Football Superleague of Kosovo: 2013–14

Vitesse
KNVB Cup: 2016–17

References

External links

1996 births
Living people
Sportspeople from Vushtrri
Kosovo Albanians
Kosovan footballers
Albanian footballers
Association football wingers
Dual internationalists (football)
Kosovo international footballers
Albania youth international footballers
Albania under-21 international footballers
Albania international footballers
Football Superleague of Kosovo players
Eredivisie players
Bundesliga players
Premier League players
English Football League players
Süper Lig players
KF Vushtrria players
SBV Vitesse players
SV Werder Bremen players
Norwich City F.C. players
Galatasaray S.K. footballers
Kosovan expatriate footballers
Albanian expatriate footballers
Kosovan expatriate sportspeople in the Netherlands
Albanian expatriate sportspeople in the Netherlands
Expatriate footballers in the Netherlands
Albanian expatriate sportspeople in Germany
Kosovan expatriate sportspeople in Germany
Expatriate footballers in Germany
Albanian expatriate sportspeople in England
Kosovan expatriate sportspeople in England
Expatriate footballers in England
Albanian expatriate sportspeople in Turkey
Kosovan expatriate sportspeople in Turkey
Expatriate footballers in Turkey